The  is an electric multiple unit (EMU) train type operated by Tokyo Metro in Tokyo, Japan. Introduced into service in 1993, a total of six 10-car sets were manufactured by Kawasaki Heavy Industries and Nippon Sharyo between 1993 and 1994 for use on the Tokyo Metro Yūrakuchō Line. From 2006, the sets were permanently transferred to the Tokyo Metro Tōzai Line to replace ageing 5000 series trainsets.

Operations

Current
 Tokyo Metro Tōzai Line
 Tōyō Rapid Line between Nishi-Funabashi Station and Tōyō-Katsutadai Station
 JR Chūō-Sōbu Line between Nakano Station and Mitaka Station
 JR Chūō-Sōbu Line between Nishi-Funabashi Station and Tsudanuma Station (weekday mornings and evenings only)

Former

 Tokyo Metro Yurakucho Line between Wakōshi and Shin-Kiba (from 1992 until 2008); during that period the 07 series EMUs also inter-ran into the Tobu Tojo Line to Kawagoeshi and on the Seibu Yūrakuchō Line and Seibu Ikebukuro Line to Hannō Station via Nerima Station
 Tokyo Metro Chiyoda Line (Set 07-101, September – December 2008)

Formation
The six 10-cars sets, numbered 71 to 76, are formed as shown below, with car 1 at the west (Nishi-Funabashi) end.

Cars 2, 4, 7, and 9 each have one lozenge-type pantograph.

Interior

Driver's cab
The front ends have an emergency exit. Headlights and taillights are round. Sets are fitted with skirts. These were modified on sets transferred to the Tōzai Line.

The trains originally had a two-handle control system. Tōzai Line sets were modified with a single-handle (left-hand) system on transfer to the Tōzai Line. The Tōzai Line sets have a master controller which incorporates a deadman system which applies the brakes if the master controller is released by the driver.

History

The first sets (07-101 and 07-102) were introduced in 1992. Four more sets (07-103 to 07-106) were delivered in 1994. The six 10-car sets were initially all based on the Tokyo Metro Yūrakuchō Line, but with the introduction of the 10000 series, between July 2006 and March 2007, four sets (07-103 to 07-106) were transferred to the Tokyo Metro Tōzai Line to replace ageing 5000 series trains, and were repainted into that line's color scheme with light blue waistline stripes. The two remaining Yurakucho Line sets (07-101 and 07-102) were stored out-of-use from October 2007. Set 07-101 was subsequently repainted into the Tōzai Line colours at Shin-Kiba Works, and temporarily reallocated to the Tokyo Metro Chiyoda Line from September until December 2008.

Refurbishment 
Beginning in 2017, the 07 series fleet has undergone a programme of refurbishment, also known as "class B repair". The programme included the installation of LED lighting throughout, full-colour destination displays, and updated door chimes and flooring. The first set to undergo refurbishment (07-103) returned to service on the Tozai Line on 15 August 2018, and on the Chūō-Sōbu and Tōyō Rapid lines on 25 October of that year.

References

External links

 Tokyo Metro Tōzai Line 07 series information 

Electric multiple units of Japan
07 series
Kawasaki multiple units
Train-related introductions in 1992
Nippon Sharyo multiple units
1500 V DC multiple units of Japan